HSV ODIN '59 is a football club from Heemskerk, Netherlands. The club was founded in 1959 and is currently playing in the Derde Divisie Saturday. ODIN stands for Ons Doel Is Nuttig (Our purpose is useful).

In the 2021–22 season, ODIN lost in the first round of the relegation playoffs, and were relegated to the Hoofdklasse.

References

External links
 Official site 

Football clubs in the Netherlands
Football clubs in Heemskerk
Association football clubs established in 1959
1959 establishments in the Netherlands